Aurangabad District may refer to:
Aurangabad District, Bihar
Aurangabad District, Maharashtra

District name disambiguation pages